The 2000 Colchester Borough Council election took place on 4 May 2000 to elect members of Colchester Borough Council in Essex, England. One third of the council was up for election and the council stayed under no overall control.

After the election, the composition of the council was:
Liberal Democrats 23
Conservative 22
Labour 14
Tiptree Residents Association 1

Background
Before the election the Liberal Democrats had the most seats on the council with 25, compared to 18 for the Conservative Party, 15 for the Labour Party, 1 for the Tiptree Residents' Association and 1 other Independent. Among the 20 councillors who were defending seats at the election were the Liberal Democrat leader of the council for the last two years, Colin Sykes in Stanway, and the Liberal Democrat mayor Martin Hunt in Prettygate.

Four Liberal Democrat and three Labour councillors stood down at the election including the Liberal Democrat former leader of the council, Steve Cawley in Shrub End.

Election result
The Conservatives gained four seats, while the Liberal Democrats suffered a net loss of two seats. The Liberal Democrats just remained the largest party, but among those to lose their seats to the Conservatives were the council leader Colin Sykes in Stanway by 54 votes and the mayor Martin Hunt in Prettygate by 213 votes. Labour remained third after losing two seats, but also gaining one, while Tony Webb was the only Independent to remain on the council after holding his seat in Tiptree.

Following the election Bill Frame was chosen as leader of the Liberal Democrat group defeating Terry Sutton and he then became the new leader of the council.

Ward results

Berechurch

Castle

Dedham

East Donyland

Fordham

No Independent Conservative candidate as previous (1.7%).

Harbour

Lexden

Marks Tey

Mile End

New Town

Prettygate

St Andrew's

St Anne's

St John's

St Mary's

Shrub End

Stanway

Tiptree

West Mersea

Wivenhoe

By-elections

Lexden

Prettygate

Mile End
A by-election took place in Mile End on 22 November 2001 after the resignation of Liberal Democrat councillor David Goatley due to pressure of work.

References

2000 English local elections
2000
2000s in Essex